Regina Chistyakova (née Nyderytė; born 7 November 1961) is a Lithuanian former distance runner, who competed at distances from 1500 metres up to 10,000 metres. Her highest individual honours were three bronze medals in the 3000 metres at the 1986 Goodwill Games, 1986 European Athletics Indoor Championships, and the 1989 Summer Universiade.

She helped the Soviet women's team to three straight titles at the IAAF World Cross Country Championships between 1988 and 1990, teaming with Yelena Romanova, Marina Rodchenkova, Olga Bondarenko, Nadezhda Stepanova, and Natalya Sorokivskaya among others. She also helped the Soviets win the Yokohama International Women's Ekiden in 1988 and 1990. At national level, she was the Soviet national champion in the 3000 m in 1986.

She later went on to win four distance running titles at the Lithuanian Athletics Championships and was twice 3000 m champion at the Lithuanian Indoor Athletics Championships. She competed internationally for Lithuania at the 1993 World Championships in Athletics, the 1994 European Cross Country Championships, 1995 IAAF World Cross Country Championships, and the 2009 World Masters Athletics Championships. She topped the field in the 1500 m and 3000 m for Lithuania in the C Final of the European Cup.

Chistyakova was born in Tytuvėnai in the Lithuanian SSR of the Soviet Union, one of nine children in her family. She graduated with a bachelor's degree in physical education from the Lithuanian University of Educational Sciences in 1993. She married fellow athlete Alexander Chistiakov and has a son, also called Alexander. A resident of Vilnius, she was a long-list candidate for the Order and Justice Party in the 2016 Seimas elections.

Among her outings on the professional circuit, she won the Cross der Vlaanderen in 1990, and the Silvesterlauf München and Neusser Sommernachtslauf in 1993. She had top three finishes at the Cross Zornotza and Brothers Znamensky Memorial meets. She holds the Baltic records and Lithuanian records for the outdoor 3000 m and indoor 5000 metres with her bests of 8:39.25 minutes and 15:49.06 minutes, respectively.

International competitions

National titles
Soviet Athletics Championships
3000 m: 1986
Lithuanian Athletics Championships
1500 m: 1993
3000 m: 1991, 1993
Cross country long race: 1990
Lithuanian Indoor Athletics Championships
3000 m: 1991, 1995

See also
List of European Athletics Indoor Championships medalists (women)

References

External links

1961 births
Living people
People from Kelmė District Municipality
Soviet female middle-distance runners
Soviet female long-distance runners
Lithuanian female middle-distance runners
Lithuanian female long-distance runners
World Athletics Championships athletes for Lithuania
Soviet female cross country runners
Lithuanian female cross country runners
Universiade bronze medalists for the Soviet Union
Universiade medalists in athletics (track and field)
Medalists at the 1989 Summer Universiade
Competitors at the 1986 Goodwill Games
Goodwill Games medalists in athletics
Lithuanian University of Educational Sciences alumni